Watansoppeng is a town in South Sulawesi province of Indonesia and it is the capital of Soppeng Regency. This town is also popular as Kota Kalong, which means megabat city. About 12,500 black Flying-foxes overhang on trees in city.

Charley Boorman visited Watansoppeng in 2009 as part of By Any Means 2.

See also

 List of regencies and cities of Indonesia

Populated places in South Sulawesi
Regency seats of South Sulawesi